Alexandru Cătălin Coman (born 16 October 1991) is a Romanian footballer who plays as an right back for Vedița Colonești.

Honours
FC Voluntari
 Romanian Cup : 2016–17

References

External links

Gallery 

1991 births
Living people
Romanian footballers
Romania under-21 international footballers
Association football midfielders
Liga I players
Liga II players
Liga III players
Cypriot First Division players
FC Rapid București players
ASC Daco-Getica București players
FC Olt Slatina players
FC Petrolul Ploiești players
Ethnikos Achna FC players
FC Brașov (1936) players
FC Voluntari players
CS Balotești players
FC Hermannstadt players
FC Universitatea Cluj players
FC Metaloglobus București players
Romanian expatriate footballers
Romanian expatriate sportspeople in Cyprus
Expatriate footballers in Cyprus